Randall Paul Stout (May 6, 1958 – July 11, 2014) was a Los Angeles, California based architect.

Early life and education
Born and raised in Tennessee, Stout held a Bachelor of Architecture from the University of Tennessee and a Master of Architecture from Rice University.

Career

Before starting his own firm, Stout worked four years at Skidmore, Owings and Merrill, and seven and a half years for Frank O. Gehry & Associates.

Death
Stout died of renal cell cancer on July 11, 2014, in Los Angeles.  He was 56.

Completed Works

 Hunter Museum of American Art, Chattanooga, Tennessee (2005)
 Steinhude Sea Recreational Facility, Germany
 Bünde Fire Station, Germany
 Stadtwerke Bückeburg, Bückeburg, Germany (1998)
 Taubman Museum of Art, Roanoke, Virginia, United States (2008)
 Art Gallery of Alberta, Edmonton, Alberta, Canada (2010)
 Abroms-Engel Institute for the Visual Arts, University of Alabama at Birmingham, Birmingham, Alabama (2014)

External links
 Randall Stout Architects, Inc.
 Randall Stout Architects Facebook

References

20th-century American architects
Architects from Los Angeles
Architects from Tennessee
1958 births
2014 deaths
People from Knoxville, Tennessee
Rice University alumni
University of Tennessee alumni
Skidmore, Owings & Merrill people
Deaths from cancer in California
Deaths from kidney cancer